Fanfare for the Volunteer is an album of three pieces for violin and orchestra by composer and violinist Mark O'Connor with the London Philharmonic Orchestra under the direction of Steven Mercurio.  Originally conceived as O'Connor's second "fiddle concerto", the three movements became separate pieces during the course of composition.  Like his other classical works, the three pieces on the album: "Call of the Mockingbird", "Trail of Tears" and "Fanfare for the Volunteer" use styles and motifs from American folk music and the traditional Anglo-American fiddling techniques on which O'Connor was weaned.

Track listing
All music written by Mark O'Connor
"Call of the Mockingbird" – 20:26
"Trail of Tears" – 16:08
"Fanfare for the Volunteer" – 20:06

Personnel
Mark O'Connor - violin
London Philharmonic Orchestra - orchestra
Steven Mercurio - conductor

References

1999 albums
Mark O'Connor albums